General elections were held in Singapore on 2 September 1972. The result was a fourth victory for the People's Action Party, which won all 65 seats, the second of four consecutive elections in which they repeated the feat. Voter turnout was 93.5% in the 57 constituencies (which represented 812,926 voters) that were contested, with PAP candidates elected unopposed in the other eight, which represents 95,456 voters.

Electoral system

The 65 members of Parliament were elected in 65 single-member constituencies, an increase from 58 in the 1968 elections. Like the previous elections, boundaries and constituencies were carved due to development or population; the newly added constituencies were:

Timeline

Campaign
Unlike the previous elections in 1968, which saw the PAP returning to power after nomination day due to low number of contests (seven out of 58 seats), this election saw contests in all but eight seats. Barisan Sosialis renounced its boycott strategy and attempted to make a comeback, while the Workers' Party saw its rejuvenation with the introduction of its new secretary-general, also lawyer and former district judge, J. B. Jeyaretnam (who would later become the inaugural opposition Member of Parliament in 1981); former leader and ex-Chief Minister David Marshall contemplated standing as an independent, but ultimately did not run due to a stingray wound. PAP candidate and architect Ong Teng Cheong, who made his debut in the election, would later serve as a Deputy Prime Minister and also the first-elected (and fifth) President of Singapore.

Describing the alternative opposition parties as having lost their credibility with swerving political manoeuvres, coupled with Singapore's strong economic progress and successful housing development, the PAP declared that Singaporeans no longer saw need for political diversity, claiming that this led to squabbling that would impede its effective governance.

Results
Despite expectations that the PAP would not coast to victory and Prime Minister Lee Kuan Yew even anticipating that the PAP winning around 45 seats would be a convincing victory, the PAP still managed to capture every seat in Parliament for the second time.

By constituency

Notes

References

Singapore
General elections in Singapore
1972 in Singapore
September 1972 events in Asia